Kanifushi Island is situated in the Lhaviyani Atoll, Maldives. Kanifushi is one of the few resort islands in Laviyani Atoll; the resort started operation on 15 December 2013, managed and operated by Atmosphere Hotels & Resorts.

Geography 
Kanifushi Island is approximately 2 km in length and 90 meters wide.

See also

List of lighthouses in the Maldives

References

Islands of the Maldives
Resorts in the Maldives
Lighthouses in the Maldives